PAF Base Shahbaz  is located at Jacobabad, in the Sindh province of Pakistan. It is a military base operated by the Pakistan Air Force (PAF) as well as a civilian airport.

Lockheed Martin contract personnel are present here as the PAF takes ownership of 18 new F-16 Fighting Falcon fighter aircraft and works to bring these aircraft up to operational capability.

References

External links 
United States embassy press release on the base
Shahbaz Air Base, Jacobabad, Pakistan at GlobalSecurity.org

Pakistan Air Force bases
Military installations in Sindh